The list of shipwrecks in 1919 includes ships sunk, foundered, grounded, or otherwise lost during 1919.

January

1 January

2 January

3 January

4 January

5 January

6 January

8 January

9 January

10 January

11 January

13 January

15 January

16 January

17 January

20 January

21 January

22 January

23 January

25 January

28 January

29 January

30 January

February

1 February

4 February

5 February

6 February

7 February

8 February

10 February

11 February

13 February

15 February

18 February

20 February

22 February

23 February

24 February

27 February

28 February

Unknown date

March

2 March

3 March

5 March

6 March

7 March

12 March

14 March

15 March

16 March

18 March

19 March

24 March

27 March

28 March

Unknown date

April

3 April

6 April

9 April

12 April

15 April

16 April

17 April

18 April

19 April

21 April

24 April

27 April

28 April

29 April

Unknown date

May

1 May

2 May

4 May

5 May

9 May

11 May

13 May

15 May

16 May

19 May

20 May

21 May

24 May

Unknown date

June

2 June

9 June

11 June

14 June

15 June

16 June

17 June

18 June

21 June

22 June

24 June

27 June

28 June

Unknown date

July

3 July

5 July

12 July

15 July

16 July

22 July

26 July

27 July

30 July

August

1 August

9 August

10 August

11 August

13 August

14 August

18 August

19 August

23 August

25 August

30 August

Unknown date

September

1 September

4 September

5 September

8 September

9 September

10 September

11 September

16 September

21 September

23 September

24 September

25 September

29 September

30 September

October

1 October

2 October

3 October

4 October

5 October

7 October

8 October

9 October

17 October

18 October

19 October

20 October

22 October

24 October

28 October

29 October

31 October

Unknown date

November

1 November

4 November

5 November

7 November

9 November

11 November

13 November

14 November

18 November

20 November

22 November

24 November

Unknown date

December

1 December

5 December

8 December

9 December

11 December

12 December

18 December

20 December

25 December

Unknown December

Unknown date

References 

 

1919
 
Ships